Steam is the fourth album by the Canterbury associated band Soft Machine Legacy and their second studio album, released on CD in 2007. This is the final Soft Machine project to feature bassist Hugh Hopper prior to his death in June 2009. He was replaced by Roy Babbington, Soft Machine member from 1973 to 1976. Babbington has previously replaced Hopper in Soft Machine-proper. Steam also marks the first appearance of Theo Travis in the group replacing Elton Dean who died in February 2006 at age 60.

Track listing
 "Footloose" (8:46) (Hugh Hopper)
 "The Steamer" (4:38) (Theo Travis)
 "The Big Man" (5:08) (Hugh Hopper / John Etheridge / John Marshall / Theo Travis)
 "Chloe & The Pirates" (7:27) (Mike Ratledge)
 "In The Back Room" (7:10) (John Etheridge)
 "The Last Day" (5:20) (Theo Travis)
 "Firefly" (6:41) (Hugh Hopper / John Marshall)
 "So English" (8:29) (Hugh Hopper / John Etheridge / John Marshall / Theo Travis)
 "Dave Acto" (6:25) (Hugh Hopper / John Etheridge / John Marshall / Theo Travis)
 "Anything to Anywhere" (5:20) (Theo Travis)

Personnel
 Theo Travis – tenor sax, soprano sax, flute, loops
 John Etheridge – electric guitar
 Hugh Hopper – bass guitar, loops
 John Marshall – drums, percussion

Credits 
 Recorded by Jon Hiseman, at Temple Studios, Surrey, England; December 28–30, 2006.
 Mixed and mastered by Jon Hiseman & Soft Machine Legacy, Temple Studios, Surrey, England; January 2007.
 Produced by Soft Machine Legacy.
 Executive Producer: Leonardo Pavkovic.

References

External links

2007 albums
Soft Machine Legacy albums